Darzamat is a Polish atmospheric black metal band, founded in 1995. After a few initial releases (In Flames of Black Arts, Oniriad and the MCD In the Opium of Black Veil), the founding member Flauros (vocals) managed to gather musicians who have since been identified as the band's core: guitar players Chris and Daamr, female vocalist Nera and keyboard player Spectre. The album Semidevilish, released in 2004, established the sound of the newly consolidated band and gave it strength to start appearing more regularly on stage.

The following year saw the release of Transkarpatia. The album, produced by Andy LaRocque, the guitar force behind King Diamond. As a result, Darzamat started to be feature in such European festivals as Rock Hard Open, Wave Gothic Treffen, Hard Rock Laager, S-Hammer Festival, Last Night on Earth, Dong Open Festival, Moscow After Midnight and Metal Head Mission. At that time, the band found themselves performing for an ever widening circle of audiences in Balkan states, Czech Republic, Slovakia, Belgium, Holland, Italy, France and Germany. Also around that time Darzamat embarked on tours supporting Sabaton in Benelux countries and Moonspell in Poland.

The year 2007 saw the band perform on Winternachtstraum Festival and on the 21st edition of the Polish Metalmania Festival, organized since the 1980s. This performance was documented on the DVD album Live Profanity (Visiting the Graves of the Heretics), released internationally.

In the 2009 Darzamat landed a worldwide record deal with Massacre Records, a German label, and delivered their fifth album, Solfernus’ Path, also made available in Japan. Solfernus’ Path marked the first time the band ever ventured into a concept album territory. Andy LaRocque moved from the production seat to the guest-musician spot and contributed a solo on ‘The King of the Burning Anthems’. The song, along with two other ones—'Pain Collector’ and ‘Chimera’—was selected to promote the album and all three were made into videos. Darzamat toured in Poland, Mexico, France, Czech Republic, Ukraine and Belgium, then returned to Poland to make an appearance at the Castle Party Festival.

In 2011 the band took a long break. Nera used her time away to focus on her solo project, NeraNature, which features gentler, atmospheric rock laced with electronics. She delivered three albums, with the latest one, MagJa, released in 2018. Flauros, on the other hand, decided to bring back the black metal act Mastiphal. In 2011 Parvzya (Witching Hour) was released, the first new full-length since the 1995 debut For a Glory of All Evil Spirits...

In 2019 Darzamat announced a new album The Burning Kingdom. The fans can expect another concept album, picking up the story right where its predecessor left off. Flauros, the main creative force behind the work, has revealed that this chapter takes place in London and that the lyrics for the album were penned by him and a long-time friend and writer, Jesion Kowal. Musically, the album opens a new era in Darzamat's history: gone are the keyboards, up till now characteristically prominent. In their place the band inserts more diversified and complex guitar sounds. Pre-production and recording sessions for The Burning Kingdom were overseen by Maurycy ‘Mauser’ Stefanowicz of Vader fame; production and mixing were handled by Polish producer, Jarosław Baran. The record was due for release in 2020.

Band members

Current
Agnieszka "Nera" Górecka – vocals (2003–present)
Rafał "Flauros" Góral – vocals (1995–present)
Krzysztof "Chris" Michalak – guitar (2001–present)
Marek "Markus" Tkocz – bass (2009–present)

Former
Szymon "Simon" Strużek - bass, Guitars, Keyboards, Programming (1995-2003)
Katarzyna "Kate" Banaszak - vocals (1996-2002)
Krystian "Bomba" Bytom- drums (1997-1999)
Damian "Daamr" Kowalski - guitars (1997-2004, 2007–2008), bass (2003-2004, 2007–2008)
Paweł Chudzicki - drums (1999-2002)
Karolina Widera - vocals (2002)
Tomasz "Golem" Dańczak - drums (2003-2006)
Patryk "Spectre" Kumór - keyboards (2003-2009)
Krzysztof "Xycho" Klosek - bass (2004-2007)
Piotr "Lestath" Leszczyński- drums (2007-2008)
Maciej "Darkside" Kowalski – drums (2006-2007, 2009–2011)
 Paweł "Senator" Nowak - drums (2011-2015)

Timeline

Discography

Studio albums
 In the Flames of Black Art (1997)
 Oniriad (2003)
 Semidevilish (2004)
 Transkarpatia (2005)
 Solfernus' Path (2009)
 A Philosopher at the End of the Universe (2020)

EPs
 In the Opium of Black Veil (1999)

Video albums

Music videos

References

External links
 Official Homepage

Metal Mind Productions artists
Polish black metal musical groups
Polish symphonic metal musical groups
Musical groups established in 1995
Symphonic black metal musical groups
Musical quintets